State Trunk Highway 25 (often called Highway 25, STH-25 or WIS 25) is a state highway in Wisconsin, United States. The route serves local traffic in the western part of the state, connecting Durand, Menomonie and Barron. It is two-lane surface road with the exception of urban multilanes within Menomonie.

Route description 
WIS 25 begins at the Minnesota state line in Buffalo County on the Mississippi River. The route enters the state from Trunk Highway 60. WIS 25 briefly follows WIS 35 north in Nelson then follows the Chippewa River, passing through Maxville and entering Pepin County. After about three miles (5 km), WIS 25 enters Durand and joins US 10 west. After two miles (3 km) of concurrency, WIS 25 turns off northeast and enters Dunn County four miles (6 km) northeast.

WIS 25 junctions with WIS 72 in Downsville six miles (10 km) north of the county line. After another seven miles (11 km), WIS 25 enters Menomonie, junctions with WIS 29 near the University of Wisconsin–Stout campus and joins US 12 in the downtown area near Lake Menomin. WIS 25 splits from US 12 after a one-mile (1.6 km) concurrency with US 12 turning northwest. WIS 25 interchanges with I-94 one-half mile north of the US 12 turnoff. After a ten-mile (16 km) segment, the highway crosses WIS 170 in Wheeler. About five miles (8 km) north of Wheeler, WIS 25 joins WIS 64 east for one mile (1.6 km) before turning north again. The highway passes through Ridgeland on the Barron County line. WIS 25 passes west of Dallas, and through the small community of Hillsdale before entering Barron thirteen miles (19 km) north of the county line. The highway crosses US 8 in Barron. WIS 25 terminates at WIS 48 seven miles (11 km) north of Barron, or five miles (8 km) east of Rice Lake

History 
The original alignment of WIS 25 was along the present-day route from Nelson to Menomonie. From Nelson southward, WIS 25 followed the routing of present-day WIS 35 to junction with then WIS 52 at Galesville. The route was truncated at Durand in the early 1920s and also extended to end at then WIS 14 (present day US 8) and to WIS 48 a few years later. The route was extended again to Nelson when WIS 35 was rerouted across a new bridge over the Chippewa River in 1933. Finally in 1947, The route was extended through Nelson and across the Mississippi River and connected to MN 60.

Major intersections

See also

References

External links 
 

025
Transportation in Buffalo County, Wisconsin
Transportation in Pepin County, Wisconsin
Transportation in Dunn County, Wisconsin
Transportation in Barron County, Wisconsin